Yonghe County is a county in the southwest of Shanxi province, China, bordering Shaanxi province to the west across the Yellow River. It is under the administration of the prefecture-level city of Linfen, and located in its northwest corner. The county government's seat is located in the town of Zhihe.

History 
In 619 CE, the area was organized as Donghezhou.

People's Republic of China 
Upon the establishment of the People's Republic of China in 1949, the county was placed under the jurisdiction of the prefecture of Linfen. In 1958, Yonghe County was briefly abolished. Upon the country's re-establishment in 1961, it was returned to Jinnan Prefecture. In 1970, the county was placed under the jurisdiction of the prefecture of Linfen, which became a prefecture-level city in 2000.

Geography 

The Yellow River flows through the county from north to south, as well as numerous tributaries, such as the Zhi River and the Sangbi River both flow through the county. The county is located in the southern end of the Lüliang Mountains.

Climate

Administrative divisions 
Yonghe County administers two towns and five townships.

Towns 

Townships 

Demographics 
In the 2010 Chinese Census, the county's population totaled 63,649, up from the 61,001 recorded in the 2000 Chinese Census. A 1996 estimate put the county's population at approximately 60,000.

References

County-level divisions of Shanxi

Linfen